Gerd Rubenbauer (born 20 May 1948 in Munich) is a retired German sports commentator.

Life 
Rubenbauer worked for many years in German television as journalist for sport programs (Bayerischer Rundfunk and ARD). On March 15, 2006, it became known that Rubenbauer had ended his career as a sports commentator for ARD as a result of a dispute with sports coordinator Heribert Faßbender. Rubenbauer had accused Faßbender of not informing him in good time about the planned reporter assignments for the 2006 World Cup. As a result, Reinhold Beckmann, Steffen Simon and Gerd Gottlob were named as World Cup commentators.

Awards 
 2003: Bayerischer Sportpreis

References

External links 
 FAZ.net:Fußball-WM: Beckmann im Finale – Rubenbauer spielt nicht mehr mit

German sports journalists
German sports broadcasters
German male journalists
20th-century German journalists
21st-century German journalists
1948 births
Living people
German male writers
ARD (broadcaster) people
Bayerischer Rundfunk people